Karel Boleslav Jirák (né Karel Bohuslav Jirák; January 28, 1891, Prague, Bohemia - January 30, 1972, Chicago, Illinois, U.S.) was a Czechoslovak composer and conductor.

Jirák became a pupil of Josef Bohuslav Foerster and Vítězslav Novák at the Charles University and at music academy in Prague. From 1915-18 he was the Kapellmeister at the Hamburg Opera and worked from 1918 to 1919 as a conductor at the National Theatre in Brno and Ostrava.

From 1920-30, he was a composition teacher at the Prague Conservatory, and principal conductor of the Czechoslovak Radio Orchestra until 1945.

In 1947, he emigrated to the United States, where from 1948 to 1967 a professor at Roosevelt University, Chicago, and, in 1967, a composition teacher at the Conservatory college in Chicago. He remained in this position until 1971.

Jirák's opera was Apolonius z Tyany (Apollonius of Tyana, 1912–1913), which was initially ignored by Prague's National Theatre and later accepted under the title Žena a Bůh (The Woman and the God, 1936). He wrote six symphonies and several symphonic variations.

In 1952, he wrote a Symphonic Scherzo for volume. He also wrote many suites and overtures, numerous pieces of chamber music, many preludes and a Suite for organ, a Requiem, choruses, and song cycles. He was a popular and renowned musical theorist.

References

External links
Biography, Musicbase.cz; accessed February 10, 2018.
 Piano Concerto (1946)

1891 births
1972 deaths
Czech composers
Czech male composers
20th-century composers
20th-century Czech male musicians
Charles University alumni